Eoophyla leucostola is a moth in the family Crambidae first described by George Hampson in 1917. It is found in Malawi and Tanzania.

The wingspan is 18–22 mm. The forewings are white, the costa suffused with dark fuscous. There is a fuscous median fascia and a brownish mark in the disc. The hindwings are white with a yellow subbasal fascia, as well as a fuscous antemedian spot near the dorsum. Adults have been recorded on wing in May, August and October.

References

Eoophyla
Moths of Africa